The 2020 Teréga Open Pau–Pyrénées was a professional tennis tournament played on indoor hard courts. It was the second edition of the tournament which was part of the 2020 ATP Challenger Tour. It took place in Pau, France between 24 February and 1 March 2020.

Singles main-draw entrants

Seeds

 1 Rankings are as of 17 February 2020.

Other entrants
The following players received wildcards into the singles main draw:
  Benjamin Bonzi
  Leo Borg
  Jerzy Janowicz
  Harold Mayot
  Rayane Roumane

The following players received entry into the singles main draw using protected rankings:
  Arthur De Greef
  Blaž Kavčič

The following players received entry into the singles main draw as alternates:
  Lucas Miedler
  Andrea Vavassori

The following players received entry from the qualifying draw:
  Fabien Reboul
  Tseng Chun-hsin

Champions

Singles

 Ernests Gulbis def.  Jerzy Janowicz 6–3, 6–4.

Doubles

 Benjamin Bonzi /  Antoine Hoang def.  Simone Bolelli /  Florin Mergea 6–3, 6–2.

References

Teréga Open Pau-Pyrénées
2020 in French tennis
February 2020 sports events in France
March 2020 sports events in France